Nivasar railway station is a station on Konkan Railway. It is at a distance of  down from origin. The preceding station on the line is Ratnagiri railway station and the next station is Adavali railway station.

The station offers free Wi-Fi.

References

Railway stations along Konkan Railway line
Railway stations in Ratnagiri district
Ratnagiri railway division